Robert Schumann (1810–1856) was a German composer, music director and publisher of a trade paper. 

Schumann or Schuman may also refer to:
 Schumann (surname), a surname and list of people with names Schumann or Schuman
 Shuman (surname), list of people with the name
 Schuman roundabout, an area of Brussels
 Schuman railway station
 4003 Schumann, an asteroid
 Robert Schuman University, named for French politician Robert Schuman
 Robert Schumann Hochschule, a university for music and media in Düsseldorf

See also 
 Neal-Schuman Publishers, an imprint of the American Library Association
 Robert Schuman Prize for European Unity
 Schoeman (surname)
 Schuman Declaration, Robert Schuman's appeal in 1950 to place French and German coal and steel industries under joint management
 Schumann Center for Media and Democracy, an American media-analysis organization
 Schumann resonances, peaks in the Earth's electromagnetic field spectrum, named for Winifred Otto Schumann
 Shuman (disambiguation)